Maiakawanakaulani Roos (born 27 July 2001) is a New Zealand rugby union player. She plays as a Lock for the Black Ferns internationally and was a member of their 2021 Rugby World Cup champion squad. She also plays for the Blues Women in the Super Rugby Aupiki competition and represents Auckland provincially.

Rugby career

2019–2020 
Roos was head girl at Tamaki College. She debuted for the Auckland Storm in 2019 while she was still in school and also played for the New Zealand Barbarians in 2020.

2021 
Roos was part of the inaugural Blues women's team that played in the first match against the Chiefs at Eden Park. She made her test debut for the New Zealand national women's side, the Black Ferns, against England in November.

2022 
Roos signed with the Blues for the inaugural Super Rugby Aupiki season in 2022. She was named in the Blues starting line up for their first game against Matatū, they won 21–10. She also started in their 0–35 thrashing by the Chiefs Manawa in the final round.

Roos was selected for the Black Ferns squad for the 2022 Pacific Four Series. She scored her first international try against Canada at the Pacific Four Series. She returned to the team for a two-test series against the Wallaroos for the Laurie O'Reilly Cup in August.

Roos made the selection for the Black Ferns squad to the 2021 Rugby World Cup. She scored a try in the second pool game against Wales. She also scored a try in the final pool game against Scotland.

References

External links 
 Black Ferns Profile
 Blues Profile

2001 births
Living people
New Zealand women's international rugby union players
New Zealand female rugby union players
People educated at Tamaki College
Rugby union locks